Air Inuit (Inuktitut syllabics: ᐃᓄᐃᑦ ᖃᖓᑦᑕᔪᖏᑦ) is an airline based in the Montreal borough of Saint-Laurent, Quebec, Canada. It operates domestic passenger services and charter and cargo services in Nunavik, Labrador and Nunavut. Its main base is Kuujjuaq Airport.

History
The airline was established and started operations in 1978 using a de Havilland Canada DHC-2 Beaver aircraft. The airline is collectively owned by the Inuit of Nunavik through the Makivik Corporation.

In 1984 acquired Chaparal Charters and its fleet of two Twin Otters and one Douglas DC-3.

In 2012, Air Inuit relocated their headquarters to a new multi-purpose facility on Côte-Vertu Boulevard near the Montréal–Trudeau International Airport.

In 2016, Air Inuit pilot Melissa Haney became the first female Inuk pilot to reach the rank of captain. She was featured on a commemorative postage stamp released by the Canadian Ninety-Nines.

Destinations
Air Inuit operates scheduled services to the following domestic destinations (October 2022):

Scheduled flights

Charters

Air Inuit also offers other charter services to anywhere in North America.

Fleet
As of October 2022, the Air Inuit fleet includes the following aircraft:

Air Inuit also has access to a Eurocopter Écureuil (Aerospatiale ASTAR 350) through Nunavik Rotors and a de Havilland Canada DHC-3 Otter through Johnny May's Air Charters.

On 1 March 2016, Bombardier Inc. announced that Air Inuit would be the launch customer for the Bombardier Q300 Large Cargo Door freighter.

Accidents and incidents
On 16 March 1981, Douglas C-47 Skytrain, C-FIRW, was damaged beyond repair when it broke through the frozen surface of Lake Bienville while taxiing for take-off on a cargo flight.

References

External links

Official website

Regional airlines of Quebec
Airlines established in 1978
Regional airlines of Nunavut
Companies based in Montreal
Inuit transport
Dorval